An angle is a figure formed by two rays or a measure of rotation.

Angle may also refer to:

Places

United States
 The Angle, in the American Civil War, an area of the Gettysburg battlefield
 Angle Creek, a river in Alaska
 Angle Township, Lake of the Woods County, Minnesota
 Northwest Angle, known as "The Angle", the only place in the US outside Alaska that is north of the 49th parallel

United Kingdom

Wales
 Angle, Pembrokeshire, a village, parish and community
 Angle Peninsula Coast, Pembrokeshire

Music
 Angle (album), a 1969 album by pianist Howard Riley
 An Angle, an American rock band

Science and technology
 Angle (rib), an anatomical characteristic
 ANGLE (software), a graphics engine abstraction layer

People
 Beatrice Angle (1859-1915), British artist
 Carol Remmer Angle, American pediatrician, nephrologist and toxicologist
 Edward Angle (1855–1930), American dentist, widely regarded as the father of modern orthodontics
 Eric Angle (born 1967), brother of Kurt Angle, professional wrestler
 Jared Angle, New York City Ballet principal dancer
 Jim Angle (1946-2022), American journalist
 Kurt Angle (born 1968), Olympic gold medalist in amateur wrestling, and professional wrestler
 Sharron Angle (born 1949) i, Nevada politician
 Tyler Angle, New York City Ballet soloist

Other uses
 Angle (astrology), a cardinal point of an astrological chart
 Angles, a Germanic tribe that settled in Britain
 Angling, a fishing technique
 Angle (journalism)
 Angle, in professional wrestling terminology, a character's motivating story
 Structural angle

See also
 Angle of attack
 Angle of incidence (disambiguation)
 Angle of parallelism
 Angle of repose
 Angle of view
 Angle Man
 Angles (disambiguation)
 Angel (disambiguation)
 Bloody Angle (disambiguation)
 Team Angle (disambiguation)
 The Ingraham Angle, an American talk show on Fox News Channel hosted by Laura Ingraham